Erik Bukrán (born 6 December 1996) is a Hungarian professional football player who plays for Békéscsaba.

Club career
On 6 July 2021 Bukrán moved to Pécs.

Club statistics

Updated to games played as of 20 May 2021.

References

External links

1996 births
Living people
Sportspeople from Eger
Hungarian footballers
Hungary youth international footballers
Hungary under-21 international footballers
Association football goalkeepers
Diósgyőri VTK players
Pécsi MFC players
Békéscsaba 1912 Előre footballers
Nemzeti Bajnokság I players
Nemzeti Bajnokság II players
Hungarian expatriate footballers
Expatriate footballers in England
Hungarian expatriate sportspeople in England